Schinia saturata, the brown flower moth, is a moth of the family Noctuidae. The species was first described by Augustus Radcliffe Grote in 1874. It is found in the United States from south Texas to South Dakota, southeast Arizona and from Florida to South Carolina.

The wingspan is about 25 mm. There is one generation per year.

The larvae feed on Heterotheca subaxillaris and Pityopsis graminifolia.

External links

Schinia
Moths of North America
Moths described in 1874